Aajiirebi is a Nigerian magazine breakfast show hosted by the duo of Damilola Oni and Bamidele Fagboyo on DSTV and GOtv in Yoruba language. The first season of the show began airing in 2014  and the thirteen season is currently on air.

Aajiirebi is a pre-recorded 30-minute educative and entertainment talk show being aired on Africa Magic Yoruba which focus on discussions on societal and cultural issues in contemporary Nigeria and African society directed by Tunde Oladimeji and produced by Leye Fabusoro. 
The show consist of the interview segment and Anike Kilonsele corner hosted by Feyikemi Agbola in which useful and practical tips on everyday living is shared.

References 

Nigerian television talk shows
Yoruba-language television shows
2014 Nigerian television series debuts
Africa Magic original programming